Stephanie Barber is an American artist working in a variety of media. Most widely recognized as an experimental filmmaker, video artist and writer whose films include the 2013 feature DAREDEVILS, catalog, dogs, total power:dead dead dead, shipfilm "dwarfs the sea" "the inversion, transcription, evening track and attractor", "flower, the boy, the librarian", "BUST CHANCE", "the visit and the play" among others.

Life
Born in Riverhead, New York, Ms. Barber currently resides in Baltimore, Maryland.  She is the granddaughter of American jazz tubist Bill Barber. She is currently a Resident Artist in the multidisciplinary MFA program the Mt. Royal School of Interdisciplinary Art at MICA in Baltimore, MD.

Work
ArtForum wrote "Though extremely varied, the films of Stephanie Barber engage universal themes—time, death, memory, forgetting, frustration." and CinemaScope Magazine wrote "Perhaps the only rule of Stephanie Barber’s otherwise unruly art is that words not be taken for granted."

Her film and video work is most notable for her use of language and the deconstructive elements of her strangely narrative and poetic soundtracks and the tensions these create when coupled with her mysterious images (often constructed from found films or still images).

Ms. Barber has had solo exhibitions of her film work at The Museum of Modern Art, The National Gallery of Art, The San Francisco Cinematheque, Anthology Film Archives and other museums, galleries and universities. Some of her films are distributed by Canyon Cinema and videos are distributed by Video Data Bank.

Her lecture FOR A LAWN POEM is published by Publishing Genius and her chapbook poems by s.barber is available through Bronze Skull Press, which is run by the poet Roberto Harrison. Her book these here separated to see how they standing alone or the soundtrack to six films by stephanie barber was published by Publishing Genius Press in 2008 and reprinted in 2010. In 2013, Publishing Genius published her Night Moves, a book edited from comments on the YouTube video for Bob Seger's Night Moves.

She has acted in David Robbins' The Ice Cream Social, Zero TVs Milwaukee Show, the feature film Hamlet A.D.D., and Jennifer Montgomery's Threads of Belonging.  She was also a member of the influential Milwaukee music/performance group XKS.

References

External links 

Artist's website
Poetry Foundation on Stephanie Barber
Independent Exposure article
http://www.thefastertimes.com/writersonwriting/2011/07/13/almost-everyone-is-ready-stephanie-barber/
http://artforum.com/film/id=26047
http://www.afterall.org/online/submerged-narratives/
http://htmlgiant.com/author-spotlight/a-constant-froth-of-expectation-stephanie-barber-interview/
http://www.independent-magazine.org/node/57/print
http://kenbaumann.com/lamination/sbarber.html
http://paperbagazine.com/IssueNo4/Barber_someanimals.html
http://www.utne.com/blogs/blog.aspx?blogid=38&tag=lawn%20poetry
http://issuu.com/publishinggenius/docs/barber
http://www.urbanitebaltimore.com/baltimore/eye-to-eye/Content?oid=1459234

Year of birth missing (living people)
Living people
American women experimental filmmakers
American experimental filmmakers
American video artists
American multimedia artists
Filmmakers from Milwaukee
American women poets
Poets from New York (state)
21st-century American women